Edward Huntington Coley (August 22, 1861 - June 6, 1949) was bishop of the Episcopal Diocese of Central New York, serving from 1936 to 1942.

Biography 
Coley was born on August 22, 1861, in Westville, Connecticut, the son of James Edward Coley and Mary Gray Huntington. In 1884 he graduated with a Bachelor of Arts from Yale University while in 1887 he graduated in theology from Berkeley Division School. He was awarded a Doctor of Sacred Theology by Syracuse University in 1912, a Doctor of Divinity from Berkeley Divinity School in 1924 and another one from Hamilton College in 1942.

He was ordained deacon in 1887 and priest in 1888. First he served a curate of St John's Church in Stamford, Connecticut, between 1887 and 1888. In 1888 he became rector of Christ Church in Savannah, Georgia. A year later he became rector of St Mary's Church in South Manchester, Connecticut, where he remained till 1893. He then went back to St John's Church in Stamford, Connecticut,  to serve as assistant rector. Between 1897 and 1924 he was rector of Calvary Church in Utica, New York.

Coley was elected Suffragan Bishop of Central New York on May 14, 1924, and was consecrated on October 7, 1924, by Presiding Bishop Ethelbert Talbot. On May 6, 1936, he was elected Bishop of Central New York. He retired on July 1, 1942.

References 

"The Consecration of Bishop Coley" in The Living Church, October 18, 1924, p. 786.
"Edward H. Coley, Bishop" in The Living Church, June 19, 1949, pp. 21–22.

1861 births
1949 deaths
American Episcopalians
Religious leaders from New Haven, Connecticut
Yale University alumni
Berkeley Divinity School alumni
Episcopal bishops of Central New York